Campodesmidae is a family of millipedes belonging to the order Polydesmida.

Genera:
 Afrodesmus Schubart, 1955
 Campodesmoides VandenSpiegel, Golovatch & Nzoko Fiemapong, 2015
 Campodesmus Cook, 1896
 Tropidesmus Cook, 1896

References

Polydesmida